"Centrolene" petrophilum is a species of frog in the family Centrolenidae. Also called the Boyaca Giant Glass Frog.

It is endemic to Colombia.
Its natural habitats are subtropical or tropical moist montane forests and rivers. It is threatened by habitat loss. Possible causes for habitat loss: Deforestation/logging and Intensified agriculture or grazing (livestock ranching, and the cultivation of crops) and mining are the known main threats to this species.

Species Information:

 Sexual dimorphism: Females have spines but they are significantly smaller than males spines. Females are also larger than males. Females reach  and males reach  in snout to vent length.
 Locations/Habitat: Lives in tropical and subtropical moist broadleaf forests. Occurs in six geographical sites on the eastern flank of the northern portion of the Cordillera Oriental, Boyacá Department, Colombia. This species live on vegetation next to or above streams in a cloud forest, and can also be found in a secondary forest. It has an upper elevation limit of 2200 meters and a lower elevation limit of 1600 meters.  
 Mating: Females lay eggs on the sides of rocks in streams, and the larvae develop in the water. Males will defend and take care of the eggs.
 Endangered as of August 2016

See also
Cloud forest
Secondary forest
Sexual dimorphism

References

Sources

petrophilum
Taxonomy articles created by Polbot